Oh Seung-yoon (born March 27, 1991) is a South Korean actor. He began his career as a child actor.

Filmography

Television series

Web series

Film

Voice acting

Film (Korean dubbing)

Television series

Awards and nominations

References

External links

1991 births
Living people
South Korean male television actors
South Korean male film actors
South Korean male musical theatre actors
South Korean male voice actors
South Korean male child actors
Male actors from Seoul
Hanyang University alumni